is a town located in Tochigi Prefecture, Japan. ,  the town had an estimated population of 10,906 in 4028 households, and a population density of 62 persons per km².

Geography
Shioya is located in central Tochigi Prefecture.

Surrounding municipalities
Tochigi Prefecture
 Utsunomiya
 Sakura
 Nasushiobara
 Yaita
 Nikkō

Climate
Shioya has a Humid subtropical climate (Köppen Cfa) characterized by warm summers and cold winters with heavy snowfall.

Demographics
Per Japanese census data, the population of Shioya has declined over the past 70 years.

History
The villages of Tamanyu, Funyu, and Omiya were created within Shioya District of Tochigi Prefecture on April 1, 1889 with the creation of the modern municipalities system after the Meiji Restoration. The three villages merged on March 31, 1957 to create the village of Shioya. Shioya was elevated to town status on February 11, 1965.

Government
Shioya has a mayor-council form of government with a directly elected mayor and a unicameral town council of 12 members. Shioya, together with the city of Sakura and town of Takanezawa collectively contributes two members to the Tochigi Prefectural Assembly. In terms of national politics, the town is part of Tochigi 2nd district of the lower house of the Diet of Japan.

Economy
The economy of Shioya is heavily dependent on agriculture, but is increasingly a bedroom community for the nearby cities of Utsunomiya and Nikkō.

Education
Shioya has three public primary schools, one public middle school operated by the town government, and one public high school operated by the Tochigi Prefectural Board of Education.

Transportation

Railway
Shioya does not have any passenger train service.

Highway

Local attractions
Shojinzawa Yusui – one of the 100 famous springs of Japan
Shioya Onsen

References

External links

Official Website 

Towns in Tochigi Prefecture
Shioya, Tochigi